The "Fire and Water Fountain", also commonly referred to as the "Dizengoff Square Fountain", is a Tel Aviv landmark in the center of the Dizengoff Square. Dedicated in 1986, the fountain is a kinetic sculpture, the work of the Israeli artist Yaacov Agam.

Description 
The fountain was developed by Agam for ten years and is one of Agam's most famous creations. Agam has gained international recognition as one of the founders of the kinetic art movement. The fountain consists of an illusory dimension and a movement dimension, both typical to works of Kinetic art and Op art, which is achieved by the use of technology and by the observer's movement. The fountain is composed of several big jagged wheels, which were designed in the kinetic style (colored geometric shapes, which are perceived as different images from different angles). A technological mechanism is automatically activated at different times of the day and the night, turning the wheels on their hinges, injecting water upwards in various forms, spitting fire upwards and playing music.

Through the years the fountain drew criticism from some Tel Aviv residents for the high cost of its ongoing maintenance.

In 2012, the fountain reopened after a restoration, freshly painted and repaired.

In December 2016, the fountain was relocated to the Reading Parking Lot in north Tel Aviv for the renovation of the plaza. It was replaced on the plaza after the renovations were completed in July 2018.

On 27 February 2019, the Jerusalem Post reported, "Tel Aviv’s Dizengoff Square got back its iconic Fire and Water Fountain, which was dismantled at the end of 2016 as the public square was demolished to make way for a restructured plaza in its place". The Fire and Water Fountain was back but the monument was stripped of its colorful, artistic details and technological mechanism. It is an example of destruction of an artwork.

References

External links 

Fountains in Israel
1986 sculptures
Landmarks in Tel Aviv
Tourist attractions in Tel Aviv
White City (Tel Aviv)